Charlotte Georgina Trower (born 1855, Ware, Hertfordshire, d. 8 November 1928, Ware, Hertfordshire) was the daughter of Edward Spencer Trower and his wife Emma nee Gosselin , she was a British botanical illustrator and botanist noted for her watercolor paintings of mostly British plants and flowers.  She collaborated with her sister Alice and amateur botanist George Claridge Druce to create over 1,800 scientifically accurate paintings.  Her illustrations were used as major contributions in two books, Skene's Flower Book for the Pocket and British Brambles.

Works

References 

1855 births
1928 deaths
Botanical illustrators
19th-century British botanists
20th-century British botanists
British women botanists
British women illustrators
19th-century English painters
19th-century English women artists
20th-century English painters
20th-century English women artists
19th-century British women scientists
20th-century British women scientists
People from Ware, Hertfordshire